The 2017 Bangladesh flood may refer to:
 2017 Bangladesh landslides, in floods of June 2017
 2017 South Asian floods, of August 2017

See also
 Floods in Bangladesh